Acidicaldus is a genus in the phylum Pseudomonadota (Bacteria), whose sole member is an acidophilic thermophile.

Etymology
The name Acidicaldus derives from: New Latin acidum (from Latin adjective acidus, sour), an acid; Latin caldus, warm, hot; giving Acidicaldus, a (moderately) thermophilic acid-requiring microorganism.

Species
The genus contains  single species, namely A. organivorans (corrig. Johnson et al. 2006,  (type species of the genus); New Latin organum, organic compound; Latin vorans, devouring; giving organivorans, devouring organic compounds.)

See also
 Bacterial taxonomy
 Microbiology

References 

Monotypic bacteria genera
Bacteria genera
Rhodospirillales